Musa Nadeem Ahmed (born 10 December 1997) is a Dutch cricketer. In October 2020, he was part of the Dutch Academy squad. In May 2021, he was named in the Netherlands A team for their tour of Ireland to play the Ireland Wolves. He made his List A debut on 10 May 2021, for the Netherlands A cricket team against the Ireland Wolves. Later the same month, he was named in the Netherlands' One Day International (ODI) squad for their three-match against Ireland. On his selection for the ODI series, the Dutch team coach Ryan Campbell praised Ahmed's performance in the Topklasse competition and his hard work during the enforced international break due to the COVID-19 pandemic. He made his ODI debut on 7 June 2021, for the Netherlands against Ireland.

Personal life
Ahmed is the older brother of fellow Dutch international Musa Ahmad. Their father Nadeem Ahmad immigrated to the Netherlands from Lahore, Pakistan.

References

External links
 

1997 births
Living people
Dutch cricketers
Netherlands One Day International cricketers
Cricketers from Lahore
Pakistani emigrants to the Netherlands